Anoratha nabalua is a moth of the family Erebidae first described by Jeremy Daniel Holloway in 1976. It is found on Borneo.

References

Moths described in 1976
Hypeninae
Moths of Borneo